Industry is the first solo album by British drum and bass producer Dom & Roland. The album was released under the Moving Shadow label on 28 September 1998 as a separate CD (ASHADOW 16CD) and 4-disc vinyl LP (ASHADOW 16LP) editions, with the compact disc edition containing two extra tracks. It is considered a very influential and important album that was responsible for the development of the techstep sound in the late 1990s. Optical was featured as a co-producer on two tracks.

Track listing

References

External links
Industry on Discogs

1998 albums
Dom & Roland albums